Shuyukh Tahtani is an Arab town in northeastern Aleppo Governorate, in Syria

Located on the eastern banks of river Euphrates, behind the wetlands of the Shuyukh Plain, the town has a population of 4,338, as per the 2004 census, and is administrative center of Nahiya Shuyukh Tahtani. Some  to the north, a road bridge used to connect its larger twin town Shuyukh Fawqani to Jarabulus and the city of Manbij on the western side of Euphrates river.

References

Populated places in Ayn al-Arab District
Populated places on the Euphrates River